Nimbavali is a village in the Palghar  district of Maharashtra, India. It is located in the wada taluka. It lies on the bank of Tanasa River.

The name of village Nimbavali may be due to a big Tree of Neem standing at entrance of the village.

A famous destination for hot springs and a Nityanand swami mandir in the village Ganeshpuri is 1 km away from Nimbavali. These two villages are separated by the river Tansa and connected by a bridge.

There are two or three hot springs named Anasuya kund on land, while two or three springs are inside the river.  There are two old temples of Shiva and Bajarangbali.

The village is made up mostly of Adivasi people.

Demographics 

According to the 2011 census of India, Nimbavali has 168 households. The effective literacy rate (i.e. excluding children aged 6 and below) is 87.07%.

References 

Villages in Bhiwandi taluka